Altus House is a 37-storey, residential skyscraper in Arena Quarter, Leeds, West Yorkshire, England. The building consists of over 752 student units. At 114 m (348 ft), Altus House is the tallest building in Leeds and Yorkshire as of 2023, taking the title from Bridgewater Place in 2021.

Tallest building accolades
After topping out in late 2020, Altus House became the tallest building in West Yorkshire, and the tallest in the wider county of Yorkshire. It became Leeds' third building over  along with Bridgewater Place and Sky Plaza, the former of which previously held the title of the tallest building in Yorkshire.

It was the 13th tallest building in the United Kingdom outside Greater London upon completion.

Gallery

See also 

 Architecture of Leeds

References

External links 

Skyscrapers in Leeds
Residential skyscrapers in England
Buildings and structures under construction in the United Kingdom